Monument Valley (meaning valley of the rocks) is a region of the Colorado Plateau characterized by a cluster of sandstone buttes, the largest reaching  above the valley floor. It is located on the Utah-Arizona state line, near the Four Corners area. The valley is a sacred area that lies within the territory of the Navajo Nation Reservation, the Native American people of the area.

Monument Valley has been featured in many forms of media since the 1930s. Director John Ford used the location for a number of his Westerns; critic Keith Phipps wrote that "its  have defined what decades of moviegoers think of when they imagine the American West."

Geography and geology

The area is part of the Colorado Plateau. The floor is largely siltstone of the Cutler Group, or sand derived from it, deposited by the meandering rivers that carved the valley. The valley's vivid red color comes from iron oxide exposed in the weathered siltstone. The darker, blue-gray rocks in the valley get their color from manganese oxide.

The buttes are clearly stratified, with three principal layers. The lowest layer is the Organ Rock Shale, the middle is de Chelly Sandstone, and the top layer is the Moenkopi Formation capped by Shinarump Conglomerate. The valley includes large stone structures, including the "Eye of the Sun".

Between 1945 and 1967, the southern extent of the Monument Upwarp was mined for uranium, which occurs in scattered areas of the Shinarump Conglomerate; vanadium and copper are associated with uranium in some deposits.

Major formations include West and East Mitten Buttes, Merrick Butte, and Hunts Mesa.

Tourism

Monument Valley includes much of the area surrounding Monument Valley Navajo Tribal Park, a Navajo Nation equivalent to a national park. Oljato, for example, is also within the area designated as Monument Valley.

Visitors may pay an access fee and drive through the park on a  dirt road. Parts of Monument Valley, such as Mystery Valley and Hunts Mesa, are accessible only by guided tour.

Climate
Monument Valley experiences a desert climate with cold winters and hot summers. While the summers may be hot, the heat is tempered by the region's high altitude. Although the valley experiences an average of 54 days above  annually, summer highs rarely exceed . Summer nights are comfortably cool, and temperatures drop quickly after sunset. Winters are cold, but daytime highs are usually above freezing. Even in the winter, temperatures below  are uncommon, though possible. Monument Valley receives an occasional light snowfall in the winter; however, it usually melts within a day or two.

In visual media

Monument Valley has been featured in numerous computer games, in print, and in motion pictures, including multiple Westerns directed by John Ford that influenced audiences' view of the American West, such as: Stagecoach (1939), My Darling Clementine (1946), Fort Apache (1948), She Wore a Yellow Ribbon (1949) and The Searchers (1956).

Many more recent movies, with other directors, were also filmed in Monument Valley, including Sergio Leone's Once Upon a Time in the West (in 1967), the first Spaghetti Western to be filmed outside Europe, and Gore Verbinski's The Lone Ranger.

In Airwolf: The Movie and the subsequent series, a hollow mesa in Monument Valley was the hiding place for the fictional helicopter. It was referred to as 'Valley of the Gods'.

Gallery

Panorama

See also
 List of sandstones
 Valley of the Gods
 Uluru
 Goulding's Lodge

References

Further reading

External links

 
 
 
 
 
 
 

Native American culture
Buttes of Arizona
Landforms of Apache County, Arizona
Landforms of Navajo County, Arizona
Colorado Plateau
Regions of Arizona
Valleys of Arizona
Rock formations of Arizona
Valleys of Utah
Rock formations of Utah
Regions of Utah
Landforms of San Juan County, Utah
Religious places of the indigenous peoples of North America
Protected areas of Apache County, Arizona
Protected areas of Navajo County, Arizona
Protected areas of San Juan County, Utah
Sacred mountains
Sacred rocks
Tourist attractions in Utah
Geography of the Navajo Nation